Bandits: Phoenix Rising is a futuristic, racing action game, set in a post apocalyptic wasteland.

The player follows the pair Rewdalf and Fennec as they try to survive and make big bucks at the same time. The game was later also ported to Linux.

Reception 

The game received "mixed or average" reviews according to the review aggregation website Metacritic.

References

External links 
Grin official website
Bandits: Phoenix Rising on Moddb.com
Wolfys Mod

2002 video games
Racing video games
Grin (company) games
Video games developed in Sweden
Video games scored by Simon Viklund
Windows games
Windows-only games
Post-apocalyptic video games
Diesel (game engine) games
Vehicular combat games
Multiplayer and single-player video games
Tri Synergy games